Kirk W. Conover (born April 17, 1954) is an American Republican Party politician, who served in the New Jersey General Assembly representing the 2nd legislative district from 2003 to 2006. Conover was sworn into the Assembly in June 2003 after selection to fill the vacancy created by the resignation of Assemblyman Paul D'Amato. Conover served in the Assembly on the Telecommunications and Utilities and the Tourism and Gaming Committees.

Biography
On Election Day, November 8, 2005, former Atlantic City Mayor Jim Whelan, a Democrat, defeated Republican Conover in the Republican-leaning District.

Assemblyman Conover served on the Atlantic County Board of Chosen Freeholders from 1981 to 2003, serving as its Chairman in 1992, 1995 and from 2000 to 2003.

Conover graduated with a B.A. from Rutgers University in Economics and was awarded an M.B.A. from the University of Pennsylvania in Business Administration. He is a V.P. and Licensed Insurance Producer, Shore Agency, Inc. and a Licensed Realtor, Tilton Real Estate, Inc.  Kirk married his wife Nancy in Hawaii in 2000 and has 3 stepsons.

District 2
Each of the forty districts in the New Jersey Legislature has one representative in the New Jersey Senate and two members in the New Jersey General Assembly. The other representatives from the 2nd Legislative District are:
Assemblyman Francis J. Blee, and
Senator William Gormley

References

External links
Assemblyman Conover's Legislative Website
New Jersey Voter Information Website 2003

County commissioners in New Jersey
Living people
1954 births
Politicians from Atlantic County, New Jersey
Republican Party members of the New Jersey General Assembly
21st-century American politicians